Office national de postes is French for "national post office", and may refer to:
 national postal service, see List of national postal services
 National Post Office (Rwanda), the Office national des postes du Rwanda or "iPosita Rwanda", of Rwanda
 Office national des postes du Mali, of Mali
 Direction des services postaux de l'Office National des Postes et de l'Épargne, of Central African Republic
 Niger Poste, the Office des Postes et Télécommunications, of Niger
 ONPT, the Office National des Postes et Télécommunications, of Morocco
 Poste Maroc
 Office de la poste guinéenne, of Guinea